The 2018 Portland Timbers season is the 32nd season in their existence and the 8th season for the Portland Timbers in Major League Soccer (MLS), the top-flight professional soccer league in the United States and Canada.  The season covers the period from the end of MLS Cup 2017 to the end of MLS Cup 2018.

Background

Season review by month

Off season

Preseason

March

April
From April 5 until April 8 the eMLS Cup took place at PAX East in Boston.  Timber's eSports player Edgar Guerrero (X_Thiago_Silva_0) finished 7th in the preliminary round, giving him a spot in the Western Quarter Finals.  Guerrero would fall to Sporting Kansas City eSports player Alex Betancourt (SKC Alekzandur) in the Western Quarter Finals to a score of 3–2.

The Timbers traveled to Orlando, again without the injured Liam Ridgewell for their last away match before the home opener.  In the 16th minute, Sebastián Blanco was issued a 2nd yellow card for diving; however, VAR was called to review and the card was overturned and a penalty issued. Even with Joe Bendik guessing the right way, Diego Valeri sent the ball into the far left side of the net, putting the Timbers up 1–0. In the 59th minute,  Bill Tuiloma was able to head the ball into the net with from a free kick from Diego Valeri that would put the Timbers up 2–0.  Starting from the 80th minute, Orlando City SC would begin their comeback starting with a flick from Chris Mueller from a corner kick taken by Yoshimar Yotún, putting Orlando on the board at 2–1.  Shortly after in the 81st minute, a controversial penalty was awarded to Orlando from a foul to Dom Dwyer inside the box.  It was taken and successfully converted by Sacha Kljestan.  Finally, Orlando would seal the win in the 87th minute from a shot inside the box from Dom Dwyer.  The final score of the match was 3–2 to Orlando City SC.

On April 14, Portland hosted their home opener for the 2018 campaign against Minnesota United FC.  The Timbers Army sang the national anthem  for the home opener, as is tradition in the MLS era, followed by unveiling their Singin' in the Rain themed tifo.  In the 20th minute, Larrys Mabiala passed the ball to Alvas Powell who was a few feet past the halfway line.  Powell was able to run the ball all the way into the box and take a shot sending the Timbers up 1–0.  Shortly after in the 23rd minute, Powell was able to perform a cross to Diego Valeri.  The Timbers went up 2–0.  In the 27th minute, Minnesota's Miguel Ibarra had a goal disallowed after VAR caught him offside.  In the 30th minute, Sebastián Blanco had a howler shot from about 30 yards out to almost have another goal, but instead hit the crossbar.  In the 42nd minute, Ibbara attempted a header which Gleeson was able to make an extremely quick one handed save.  In the 64th minute, Minnesota's Darwin Quintero was able to break through the box and score their first goal of the match, changing the score to 2–1.  In the 74th minute, Blanco crossed the bar to Valeri who was deep inside the box.  Valeri dropped the ball back to Cristhian Paredes and sent it to Fanendo Adi.  Adi was quick to react and used his head to send the ball to the right side and putting the Timbers up 3–1, their highest lead of the season so far.  In the 78th minute, Adi would score once again, but would be called offside.  Finally in the 81st minute, Bill Tuiloma would accidentally volley the ball past Jake Gleeson's head and score an own goal.  The final score was 3–2, giving the Timbers their first win of the 2018 season.

On April 17, Alvas Powell was awarded MLS Week 7 Player of the Week.

On April 19, Alvas Powell won MLS Week 7 Goal of the Week.

On April 22, The Timbers defeated New York City FC 3–0 who at the time was undefeated.  Sebastián Blanco, Fanendo Adi, and Larrys Mabiala were the goal scorers and Jeff Attinella delivered the Timbers their first clean sheet of the year.

On April 23, Larrys Mabiala and coach Giovanni Savarese were awarded to MLS Team of the Week.

May

On May 5, Portland defeated San Jose Earthquakes 1–0 with a free kick goal from Diego Valeri.

On May 13, Portland defeated their rivals, Seattle Sounders 1–0 with goal from Sebastián Blanco.

On May 19, Portland continued their 5-game win streak with a 2–1 victory to Los Angeles FC.  Goals scored by Cristhian Paredes and Samuel Armenteros.  Both players achieved their first goal in MLS.  Liam Ridgewell suffered an unknown injury and was subbed off in the 6th minute.

On May 21, Samuel Armenteros was nominated for Goal of the Week (Week 12).

On May 24, The Timbers drew to host San Jose Earthquakes in the fourth round of the 2018 U.S. Open Cup on June 6.  Later that day, Samuel Armenteros won Goal of the Week (Week 12).

On May 26, Portland defeated Colorado Rapids 3–2 away.  Samuel Armenteros achieved a brace and Diego Valeri moved back into the top goalscorers for the Timbers, tied with Sebastián Blanco at 5.

On May 29, Samuel Armenteros was awarded a spot on Team of the Week (Week 13). Later on that day, he would be announced as a nominee for Goal of the Week (Week 13).

On May 31, Samuel Armenteros won his second Goal of the Week (Week 13).

June
On June 2, Portland drew LA Galaxy at home with a score of 1–1.  Diego Valeri converted a Penalty.

On June 4, David Guzmán of Costa Rica and Andy Polo of Peru, both made the final 23 man roster for the 2018 FIFA World Cup.

On June 6, Portland signed Andre Lewis, Marvin Loría, Darixon Vuelto and Renzo Zambrano from Portland Timbers 2 on short term contracts.

Later on, Portland defeated San Jose Earthquakes at home 2–0 in the 2018 U.S. Open Cup round four.

On June 7, Portland drew to host LA Galaxy on June 15 for the fifth round of the 2018 U.S. Open Cup. The other possible teams in the west pot were LAFC and USL side Sacramento Republic FC. If Portland wins round five they will either travel to LAFC or Sacramento Republic FC depending on that match's outcome.

On June 9, Portland hosted Sporting Kansas City with a result of 0–0. Their unbeaten streak continues to nine but dropped to sixth place in the Western Conference.

On June 15, Portland defeated LA Galaxy 1–0 in the round of 16 for the 2018 U.S. Open Cup.  The lone goal was scored by Sebastián Blanco, assisted by Fanendo Adi.  The Timbers have increased their undefeated streak to 10 matches.

On June 20, Portland found out they will travel to face Los Angeles FC in the quarterfinal of the 2018 U.S. Open Cup on July 18.

On June 24, Portland resumed play after the MLS 2018 FIFA World Cup break by traveling to Atlanta United FC.  Portland ended up drawing 1–1 with a goal from Larrys Mabiala, extending their unbeaten streak to 11.

On June 25, Jeff Attinella was award a spot on MLS Team of the Week: Week 17.

On June 30, Portland traveled to face their rivals Seattle Sounders FC for their first official Cascadia Cup match of the year.  Portland defeated Seattle 3–2 with Larrys Mabiala capturing a brace and Samuel Armenteros getting a goal.  The Timbers are now 12 matches unbeaten.

July
On July 2, Diego Valeri and Larrys Mabiala were awarded a spot on Team of the Week (Week 18).

On July 7, Portland defeated San Jose Earthquakes at home 2–1 with Samuel Armenteros receiving a brace.  Portland is now undefeated in 13 matches.

On July 9, Samuel Armenteros and Diego Valeri we're awarded a spot on Team of the Week (Week 19).

On July 12, Marco Farfan was announced as part of the roster for the 2018 MLS Homegrown match.

On July 15, Portland drew Los Angeles Football Club at Banc of California Stadium with a score of 0–0.  Portland is now undefeated in 14 matches.  Diego Chara received another yellow card this match and will be suspended for the next league match.

On July 17, Portland signed Argentinian midfielder Tomás Conechny on a 2018 loan with purchase option at the end of the season.

On July 18, Portland fell to Los Angeles Football Club at Banc of California Stadium with a score of 2–3.  Ending their unbeaten streak across all competitions at 14.  They are still unbeaten in league play at 11.

On July 19, Portland placed a protest stating that Los Angeles Football Club broke a U.S. Open Cup rule by playing 6 international players when the rule is 5 for professional level clubs.  The draw was delayed due to this.

On July 20, Portland officially withdrew its protest.

On July 21, Portland hosted and drew Montreal Impact 2–2.  Samuel Armenteros and Diego Valeri were the goal scorers.

On July 28, Portland defeated Houston Dynamo 2–1 with goals from Sebastián Blanco and Fanendo Adi.  Adi would score his final goal as a timber and push the Timber's league undefeated streak to 13.

On July 30, Fanendo Adi was traded to FC Cincinnati for $850,000 in allocation money.  Portland now has an open Designated Player slot.

August

On August 2, Portland's assistant head coach Sean McAuley stepped down to become an assistant coach at Orlando City SC.

On August 4, Portland defeated Philadelphia Union 3–0 at home with two successfully converted penalties by Diego Valeri and Dairon Asprilla and a goal by David Guzmán.

On August 8, Vytautas Andriuškevičius was traded to D.C. United for $50,00 in Target Allocation Money (TAM).  Portland later that day signed their former 2015 MLS Cup winner left back, Jorge Villafaña from Liga MX side Santos Laguna.  Portland traded their way to number 1 on the allocation list by giving LA Galaxy  the number 16 position in the Allocation Ranking, $75,000 in General Allocation Money (GAM) and $100,000 in 2019 TAM.

On August 9, Lucas Melano returns to Portland from loan with Estudiantes.

On August 11, Portland lost for the first time at home this season and ended their 15 league unbeaten streak against their rivals, Vancouver Whitecaps FC.  The final was a score of 2–1 with Diego Valeri converting a penalty kick.

On August 15, Portland traveled to Audi Field for the first time in Washington, D.C. and lost 4–1.  The lone goalscorer was Samuel Armenteros.

On August 17, Portland signed goalkeeper Steve Clark off waivers from D.C. United.

On August 18, Portland traveled to Children's Mercy Park to face Sporting Kansas City with a defeat of 3–0.

On August 26, Portland hosted Seattle Sounders FC in their third out of four Cascadia matches. Portland lost 0–1.

On August 28, Portland loaned out midfielder Eryk Williamson to Portuguese first-division side Clube Desportivo Santa Clara for the club's 2018–19 season with the ability to recall the player in January 2019.

On August 29, Portland defeated Toronto FC at home 2–0. Goals were scored by Diego Chará and David Guzmán.

September

On September 1, Portland traveled to Gillette Stadium to face New England Revolution.  The match ended in a 1–1 draw with a goal from Lawrence Olum.

On September 4, three players were called up to play for their national teams.  Andrés Flores for El Salvador, David Guzmán for Costa Rica, and Alvas Powell for Jamaica.

On September 8, Portland defeated Colorado Rapids at home 2–0.  The goalscorers were Jeremy Ebobisse and Diego Valeri.  Both goals were assisted by Sebastián Blanco.

On September 10, Jeremy Ebobisse, Sebastián Blanco, Zarek Valentin, Diego Chará, and Diego Valeri were all awarded spots on MLS: Team of the Week: Week 28.

On September 11, Sebastián Blanco was awarded MLS Player of the Week: Week 28.

On September 15, Portland traveled to BBVA Compass Stadium and lost to the Houston Dynamo 1–4.  The lone goal was an own goal from Houston's Alejandro Fuenmayor.

On September 19, Portland defeated Columbus Crew SC at home 3–2 with goals from David Guzmán, Andy Polo, and an own goal from Lalas Abubakar.

On September 22, Portland traveled to TCF Bank Stadium to play Minnesota United FC.  Portland lost 2–3 with goals from Alvas Powell and Sebastián Blanco.

On September 23, Alvas Powell was nominated for Goal of the Week: Week 30.

On September 24, Andy Polo was awarded a bench spot on Team of the Week: Week 30.

On September 29, Portland hosted FC Dallas that ended in a 0–0 draw.  Liam Ridgewell was sent off with a straight red in the 90+4 minute.

October
On October 6, Portland traveled to Rio Tinto Stadium where they defeated Real Salt Lake 4–1.  Goals were scored by Jeremy Ebobisse, a brace by Sebastián Blanco, and Lucas Melano.

On October 9, Sebastián Blanco was awarded a spot on Team of the Week:Week 32 and nominated for Goal of the Week:Week 32.

On October 21, Portland hosted Real Salt Lake.  Portland won 3–0, with goals from Larrys Mabiala, Diego Valeri, and Diego Chará.  Steve Clark received a clean sheet.

On October 22, Sebastián Blanco was awarded a spot on Team of the Week:Week 34.

On October 28, Portland traveled to BC Place to play their final Cascadia Cup and league match against Vancouver Whitecaps FC. Portland lost 2–1 with a goal from Andrés Flores. At the end of the match, Portland finished eighth for the Supporters' Shield, fifth in the MLS Western Conference, and third in the Cascadia Cup. Portland is set to play in the 2018 MLS Cup Playoffs knockout round against fourth seed FC Dallas.

On October 31, Portland began its 2018 MLS Cup Playoffs run by traveling to Toyota Stadium where they would face FC Dallas. Portland advanced to the 2018 MLS Western Conference Semi-final round with a 2–1 victory. Both goals were scored by Diego Valeri.

November
On November 4, Portland hosted Seattle Sounders FC for leg one of the 2018 MLS Western Conference Semi-final. Portland emerged victorious 2–1 with goals from Jeremy Ebobisse and Sebastián Blanco.

On November 5, left back Jorge Villafaña was called up for U.S. Men's National Team roster for international friendlies against England, Italy.

On November 8, Portland traveled to CenturyLink Field to take on Seattle Sounders FC for the second leg of the 2018 MLS Western Conference Semi-final.  Coming into the second leg, Portland are up 2–1 on aggregate.  The match would end at full time at 2–1 with a goal from Sebastián Blanco, sending the match into added extra time.  During the added extra time, both teams would score a goal with Dairon Asprilla being the only scorer for Portland.  The match had to be decided by penalties where Portland emerged victorious with the outcome of 4–2 with successful converted penalties by Lucas Melano, Diego Valeri, Sebastián Blanco, and Dairon Asprilla.  Portland will now face Sporting KC in the 2018 Western Conference Finals.

Midfielders Cristhian Paredes (Paraguay) and Andy Polo (Peru) were called up by their respective national teams on November 12.

On November 25, Portland hosted Sporting KC for the start of the first leg in the 2018 MLS Western Conference Finals. The game ended in a 0–0 draw.

On November 29, Portland traveled to Children's Mercy Park to finish the second leg of the 2018 MLS Western Conference Final. Portland defeated Sporting KC 3–2 and won on aggregate by the same score. Portland will travel to Mercedes-Benz Stadium to play Atlanta United FC in the 2018 MLS Cup final on December 8, 2018. This will be Portland's second appearance at an MLS Cup.

December
On December 8, Portland traveled to Mercedes-Benz Stadium for the 2018 MLS Cup Final against Atlanta United FC where they were defeated 2–0.

Team kits
Supplier: Adidas / Sponsor: Alaska Air

Coaching staff and front office

Executive staff

Coaching staff

Stadiums

Squad information

First team

 

 (HG) = Homegrown Player
 (GA) = Generation Adidas Player
 (DP) = Designated Player
 (INT) = Player using International Roster Slot
 (L) = On Loan to the Timbers
 (LO) = Loaned out to another club

eMLS team

Competitions

Competitions overview
{| class="wikitable" style="text-align: center"
|-
!rowspan=2|Competition
!colspan=8|Record
!Start Round
!First Match
!Last Match
!Final Position (Conference)
|-
!
!
!
!
!
!
!
!
!colspan=4|
|-
| Major League Soccer *

|1
|March 4, 2017
|October 28, 2017
|8th (5th Western)
|-
| MLS Cup Playoffs

|Knock Out
|October 31, 2018
|December 8, 2018
| style="background:Silver;" |Runners-up
|-
| U.S. Open Cup

|4th Round
|June 6, 2018
|July 18, 2018
|Quarterfinals
|-
| Cascadia Cup *

|15
|June 30, 2017
|October 28, 2017
|3rd
|-
! Total

!colspan=4|

* Major League Soccer and Cascadia Cup are all part of MLS regular season league play.  As a result, only Major League Soccer portion is included in the total.

Major League Soccer

Preseason

Desert Friendlies – Tucson, Arizona

MLS regular season

Western Conference

Overall standings

Matches

 

The 2018 MLS regular-season schedule was released on January 4, 2018.

Results by round

Results by location

Cascadia Cup

The Cascadia Cup is a trophy that was created in 2004 by supporters of the Portland Timbers, Seattle Sounders FC and Vancouver Whitecaps FC. It is awarded to the club with the best record in MLS regular-season games versus the other participants.  The Portland Timbers are the current Champions.  Due to the offset schedule for the 2018 MLS season, the May 13 match against Seattle does not count towards the Cascadia Cup.

Standings

Matches

MLS Cup Playoffs

U.S. Open Cup

The Timbers and all other MLS clubs join the U.S. Open Cup in round 4.

Friendlies

Player/Staff Transactions
Per league and club policy, terms of the deals are not disclosed except Targeted Allocation Money, General Allocation Money, draft picks, and international rosters spots.

Transfers in

Loans in

Loans out

Transfers out

Contract extensions

2017 MLS Re-Entry Draft Picks

2018 MLS SuperDraft Picks

Staff in

Staff out

National Team participation

Honors and awards

MLS Player of the Week

MLS Goal of the Week

MLS Team of the Week

Statistics

Appearances
Numbers in parentheses denote appearances as a substitute.

(T2) = Players called up from Portland Timbers 2 for short term contracts.

Goalkeeper stats
The list is sorted by total minutes played then by jersey number.

Top scorers
The list is sorted by shirt number when total goals are equal.

Top assists
The list is sorted by shirt number when total assists are equal.

Clean sheets
The list is sorted by shirt number when total clean sheets are equal.

Summary

References

Portland Timbers (MLS) seasons
2018 Major League Soccer season
Portland Timbers
Portland Timbers